The Kwantung Leased Territory (Kantō-shū) was a leased territory of the Empire of Japan in the Liaodong Peninsula from 1905 to 1945.

Japan first acquired Kwantung from the Qing Empire in perpetuity in 1895 in the Treaty of Shimonoseki after victory in the First Sino-Japanese War. Kwantung was located at the militarily and economically significant southern tip of the Liaodong Peninsula at the entrance of the Bohai Sea, and included the port city of Ryojun (Port Arthur/Lüshunkou). Japan lost Kwantung weeks later in the Triple Intervention and the Qing transferred the lease to the Russian Empire in 1898, who governed the territory as Russian Dalian and rapidly developed infrastructure and the city of Dairen (Dalniy/Dalian). Japan re-acquired the Kwantung lease from Russia in 1905 in the Treaty of Portsmouth after victory in the Russo-Japanese War, continued to rapidly develop the territory, and obtained extraterritorial rights known as the South Manchuria Railway Zone. Japan extended the lease with the Republic of China in the Twenty-One Demands and used Kwantung as a base to launch the Second Sino-Japanese War. The Kwantung Leased Territory ceased to exist following the Surrender of Japan in World War II in August 1945 when the Soviet Red Army began to administer the region until Kwantung and the Lüshun base was handed over to the People's Republic of China on 16 April 1955.

Etymology

The name Kwantung, means "east of Tong/Dong/Shanhai Pass", a reference to part of Qinhuangdao in today's Hebei province, at the eastern end of the Great Wall of China.  The name originally referred to all of Manchuria but later came to be used more narrowly for the area of the leased territory. In Japanese it is pronounced Kantō and it is often referred to as Kantō-shū to avoid confusion with the Kantō region surrounding the capital Tokyo.

History
In Qing dynasty China, the Liaodong Peninsula was administratively part of Liaoning Province. In 1882, the Beiyang Fleet established a naval base and coaling station at Lüshunkou near the southern end of the peninsula.

The Empire of Japan occupied the region during the First Sino-Japanese War (1894–1895), and under the terms of the Treaty of Shimonoseki signed by Japan and China ending the war in April 1895, Japan gained full sovereignty of the area. However, within weeks, Germany, France and Russia pressured Japan to cede the territory back to China, in what was called the Triple Intervention.
 

In December 1897, Russian naval vessels entered Lüshunkou harbor, which they began to use as a forward base of operations for patrols off of northern China, Korea and in the Sea of Japan.  The Russian Empire renamed the harbor Port Arthur.  In March 1898 Russia formally leased the region for 25 years from China.  The leased area extended to the northern shore of Yadang Bay on the western side of the peninsula; on the eastern side it reached Pikou; Yevgeni Ivanovich Alekseyev, chief of Russian Pacific Fleet, became the head of this territory. The peninsula north of the lease was made a neutral territory in which China agreed not to offer concessions to other countries.  In 1899, Russia founded the town of Dalniy (meaning "distant" or "remote"), just north of the naval base at Port Arthur. This would later become the city of Dalian (Dairen).

In 1898 Russia began building a railroad north from Port Arthur to link Dalniy with the Chinese Eastern Railway at Harbin; this spur line was the South Manchurian Railway.

Under the Portsmouth Treaty (1905) resulting from the Russo-Japanese War, Japan replaced Russia as leaseholder. Port Arthur was renamed Ryojun, and Dalniy was renamed Dairen. Japan also obtained extraterritorial rights in the region north of the territory adjacent to the  South Manchurian Railway in 1905 (i.e. the South Manchuria Railway Zone), which was extended north of Mukden to Changchun.  These rights, along with the railway and several spur lines were passed to the corporation known as the South Manchurian Railway Company.

The Kwantung Garrison later became the Kwantung Army, which played an instrumental role in the founding of Manchukuo. In negotiations with the Republic of China under the Twenty-One Demands, the terms of the lease of the Kwantung Leased Territory were extended to 99 years.

After the foundation of Japanese-controlled Manchukuo in 1932, Japan regarded the sovereignty of the leased territory as transferred from China to Manchukuo. A new lease agreement was contracted between Japan and the government of Manchukuo, and Japan transferred the South Manchurian Railway Zone to Manchukuo. However, Japan retained the Kwantung Leased Territory as a territory apart from the nominally-independent Manchukuo until its surrender at the end of World War II in 1945.

After World War II, the Soviet Union occupied the territory and the Soviet Navy made use of the Ryojun Naval Base. The Soviet Union turned it over to the People's Republic of China in 1955.

Administration
The Kantō-cho initially directly reported to the office of the Prime Minister of Japan; later it was subordinated to the Ministry of Colonial Affairs. Internally, the Kwantung Leased Area was divided into two districts, with two cities and nine towns. The city assemblies were in part elected, and in part appointed by the governor.

Economy
Massive capital investment was concentrated in Dairen (now the capital of the territory), wherein Japanese firms developed a significant industrial infrastructure, as well as creating a first class port out of the mediocre natural harbor. The facilities of the port at Dairen and its free trade port status made it the principal trade gateway to northeast China. The South Manchurian Railway Company was headquartered in Dairen, and some of the profits from its operation were channelled into transforming Dairen into a showcase city of modern city planning and modern architecture, with hospitals, universities and a large industrial zone.

Demographics
In the Japanese national census of 1935, the population of the Kwantung Leased Territory was 1,034,074, of whom 168,185 were Japanese nationals. The numbers excluded military personnel.

Governors

See also

 China–Japan relations
 Japanese colonial empire
 South Manchuria Railway
 Manchukuo
 Russian Dalian
 Russo-Japanese War
 Ryojun Guard District

Notes

References

 Young, C. Walter. The International Legal Status of the Kwantung Leased Territory (1931) online

 
Concessions in China
Former Japanese colonies
History of Liaoning
Foreign relations of the Qing dynasty
History of Manchuria
Bohai Sea
Yellow Sea
1895 establishments in China
1945 disestablishments in China
1895 establishments in the Japanese colonial empire
1945 disestablishments in the Japanese colonial empire
China–Japan relations
States and territories established in 1895